The Lioré-et-Olivier LeO 5 was a French ground attack biplane, built shortly after World War I, initially to the S2 armoured attack aircraft specification  and then to the Ab2 specification, from the STAé (Service Technique de l'Aéronautique).

Specifications (Leo 5)

References

Further reading

External links
 Airwar LeO 5

1910s French attack aircraft
5
Aircraft first flown in 1919
Twin piston-engined tractor aircraft
Biplanes
Rotary-engined aircraft